Koptevo is a rural locality (a village) in Kisnemskoye Rural Settlement, Vashkinsky District, Vologda Oblast, Russia. The population was 9 as of 2002.

Geography 
Koptevo is located 22 km northwest of Lipin Bor (the district's administrative centre) by road. Volkovo is the nearest rural locality.

References 

Rural localities in Vashkinsky District